Paris is an unincorporated community in northwestern Paris Township, Stark County, Ohio.  It has a post office with the ZIP code 44669.  It lies along State Route 172 between East Canton and Lisbon. The community is part of the Canton–Massillon Metropolitan Statistical Area.

History
Paris was laid out in 1813 on a stagecoach turnpike. A share of the early settlers being natives of France most likely caused the name Paris to be selected. A post office called Paris has been in operation since 1822.

References

Unincorporated communities in Stark County, Ohio
Unincorporated communities in Ohio